Aspergillus carlsbadensis is a species of fungus in the genus Aspergillus which has been isolated from the Carlsbad Caverns National Park in New Mexico in the United States. It is from the Usti section.

Growth and morphology

A. carlsbadensis has been cultivated on both Czapek yeast extract agar (CYA) plates and Malt Extract Agar Oxoid® (MEAOX) plates. The growth morphology of the colonies can be seen in the pictures below.

References

Further reading
 

carlsbadensis
Fungi described in 2011